Schistocerca obscura, the obscure bird grasshopper, is a species of grasshopper in the family Acrididae. The species occurs in the United States, from Maryland south to Florida and west to Arizona.

Gallery

References

External links

Acrididae
Orthoptera of North America
Insects described in 1798